The Dreamer is the second album by Irish singer/songwriter Jimmy MacCarthy, released in 1994 by Sony Music Ireland.

Track listing
 "Adam At The Window" - 5:25
 "Shadowy"  - 3:37
 "Lorraine"  - 4:03
 "The Highest Point"  - 5:13
 "The Perfect Present" - 4:00
 "No Frontiers" - 5:34
 "The Carrier Of Scandal" - 4:21
 "Harlem" - 4:57
 "Wonder Child" - 4:12
 "The Morning Of The Dreamer" - 4:25
 "Sacred Places" - 5:35
 "Adam (Reprise)" - 1:19

1994 albums
Jimmy MacCarthy albums